Leviola is a genus of spiders in the family Zodariidae. It was first described in 1970 by Miller. , it contains only one species, Leviola termitophila, found in Angola.

References

Endemic fauna of Angola
Zodariidae
Monotypic Araneomorphae genera
Spiders of Africa